Mills in Glossop, Derbyshire and Tintwistle, Cheshire, England. The first mills were built in the 1760s, and were powered by the water of the River Etherow and its tributaries. As the industry developed, the mills changed hands, were demolished, were converted to use steam, or consolidated into larger units. They changed their names and their functions. Water-powered mills were smaller than the later steam-powered mills found in Greater Manchester.

The mills

All registered in Annals of Glossop.

References
Notes

Bibliography

Glossop
Longdendale and Glossopdale
Longdendale
Longdendale
Longdendale
Longdendale and Glossopdale
History of the textile industry
Industrial Revolution in England